Morro Creek is a coastal stream in San Luis Obispo County, in the central region of the U.S. state of California.  The watercourse flows from the Santa Lucia Mountains to discharge into the Pacific Ocean, at its mouth on Estero Bay, near the city of Morro Bay.

Natural history
The creek is in the coastal sage and chaparral section of the California chaparral and woodlands Ecoregion.  Historically this watershed had  habitats containing considerable amounts of chaparral, and scarce Oak woodlands, and Grey Pine (Pinus sabiniana) trees.

Cultural history
The lower reaches of Morro Creek were used as a significant settlement of the Chumash tribe since at least the Millingstone Horizon.

There is also incidence of historic mining of chromium within the catchment basin. It was used extensively for grazing by the cattle ranches.

See also
 Los Osos Creek
 Morro Bay State Park
 Morro Bay State Park Museum of Natural History
 Morro Bay State Marine Recreational Management Area and Morro Bay State Marine Reserve
 Morro Rock

Notes

References
 USGS Bulletin (1910) United States Geological Survey, Published by The Survey, Item notes: no.430
 C.Michael Hogan (2008) Morro Creek, ed. by A. Burnham 

Rivers of San Luis Obispo County, California
Morro Bay
Rivers of Southern California